The Angel and Crown is a Grade II listed public house at 58 St Martin's Lane, Covent Garden, London, WC2.

It was built in the late 18th or early 19th century.

References

Covent Garden
Grade II listed pubs in the City of Westminster